Street Choirs Festival is an annual event in which choirs in the UK meet and sing together. The festival is organised by volunteers and is hosted in a different location each year. The participating choirs learn a set of songs to sing together in an outdoor 'massed sing', followed by each choir busking at a variety of locations in the host town or city, usually outdoors. Most of the choirs sing a capella and many of the choirs sing political and campaign songs and songs of peace. In 2019, the festival gathered almost 1,100 singers in Manchester.

History 
The festival began in the 1984 as the National Street Band Festival, featuring music groups as well as choirs. The festival was renamed to the National Street Music Festival in 1991. In 1997, the event became choirs only, and in 2006, changed its name to the National Street Choirs Festival. To reflect the UK-wide nature of the festival, the name was changed to Street Choirs Festival in 2013. The 2013 festival also saw the birth of the Campaign Choirs Network, a group of choirs with a shared interest in political and social campaigning. A book, Singing for our Lives: Stories from the Street Choirs has been produced by a writing collective and contains stories about the festival and interviews with attendees about their motivations for and experiences of attending the festival and singing in their choir.

Festival format 
The festival typically runs over a weekend from Friday night to Sunday afternoon. The Friday night concert features invited musicians. Guest performers at the festival have included O'Hooley and Tidow (2015), Coope Boyes and Simpson (2017) and Barnstormer 1649 featuring Atilla the Stockbroker (2018). On Saturday morning, participating choirs rehearse together a set of 'massed sing' songs before performing the massed songs together as a massed choir, usually in a prominent outdoor location in the host town or city. The massed sing in Sheffield was on the steps of Sheffield City Hall, Brighton 2018 was on the seafront and Manchester 2020 was in Cathedral Gardens.  

Busking forms an important feature of the festival. The participating choirs sing at designated locations in the host town or city on Saturday afternoon. A variety of workshops run on the Sunday morning, followed by a farewell picnic. It is a tradition to sing Billy Bragg's version of The Internationale either at the massed sing or at the farewell picnic.

Festival Hosts

References

Music festivals in the United Kingdom